The 2022–23 Houston Christian Huskies women's basketball team represented Houston Christian University in the 2019–20 college basketball season. The Huskies, led by tenth year head coach Donna Finnie, played their home games at the Sharp Gymnasium as members of the Southland Conference.  The Huskies finished the 2022–23 season with a 11–18 overall record and a 6–12 record and ninth place in conference play.  They failed to qualify for the 2023 Southland Conference women's basketball tournament.

Previous season
The Huskies finished the 2021–22 season with a 16–10 overall record and a 12–2 record in conference play winning the Southland Conference regular season championship.  They played in the 2022 Southland Conference women's basketball tournament as the No. 1 seed.  The team's season ended after losing to No. 5 seed, Incarnate Word 33–55 in the semifinal round.

Preseason polls

Southland Conference Poll
The Southland Conference released its preseason poll on October 25, 2022. Receiving five first place votes, the Huskies were picked to finish second in the conference.

Preseason All Conference
Kennedy Wilson was selected to the Preseason All Conference first team.  Julija Vujakovic was selected as a member of the second team

Roster

Schedule and results
Sources:

|-
!colspan=9 style=| Non-Conference Schedule

|-
!colspan=9 style=| Southland Conference Schedule

See also
2022–23 Houston Christian Huskies men's basketball team

References

Houston Christian Huskies women's basketball seasons
Houston Christian
Houston Christian Huskies basketball
Houston Christian Huskies basketball